The Compagnie Commerciale de Colonisation du Congo Français, also known as the CCCCF or 4CF, was a colonial concession company set up in the Sangha River region of the Republic of the Congo in the early 20th century.

See also 
 Congo Free State
 Nieuwe Afrikaanse Handels-Vennootschap
 Compagnie de l'Ouham-Nana

External links 
 The Upper-Sangha in the Time of the Concession Companies

French colonial empire
History of the Republic of the Congo